Qinggang is a masculine given name of Chinese origin. Notable persons with that name include:

Chen Qinggang (born 1966), Chinese journalist and photographer
Zhao Qinggang (born 1985), Chinese javelin thrower

See also
Qinggang County, an area in China

Chinese masculine given names